Schrankia intermedialis is a species of moth of the family Erebidae first described by J. Reid in 1972. It is found in Sweden.

Michael Fibiger treats this taxon as an interspecific hybrid of Schrankia costaestrigalis and Schrankia taenialis.

References

Moths described in 1972
Moths of Europe
Hypenodinae